Vinyl On Demand is a record label that targets vinyl collectors of 1970's and 80's minimal synth, industrial, and avant-garde music.  Along with sales to distributors, Vinyl On Demand provides a subscription service.  Most releases are limited to 500 copies and between subscribers and distributors they often sell out.

History
Vinyl On Demand was founded in 2003 by Frank Maier. Maier is a record collector and archivist whose focus has always been on early minimal synth, drone, and Industrial recordings of the late 1970s and early 1980s, particularly obscure cassette recordings. Initially Vinyl On Demand releases focused on German releases by artists such as Die Tödliche Doris, Hermann Kopp, and Mutter. Over the years the Vinyl On Demand catalog as grown to feature recordings of other late 1970s and early 1980s by musicians such as John Duncan, Clair Obscur, Current 93, The Legendary Pink Dots, SPK, Nurse With Wound, Psychic TV, Asmus Tietchens, Conrad Schnitzler, Merzbow and Stratis.

Initially Vinyl On Demand's purpose was to re-release on vinyl many of the limited edition cassettes in Frank's collection, but as time passed the reissues became deluxe box sets with material from cassettes as well as unreleased material. Early on, Vinyl On Demand began selling yearly subscriptions to collectors, often providing extras exclusively for subscribers.

Sublabels
Pripuzzi - Releases new minimal electronics and avant-garde projects.
VinylOverDose-Records - Releases up and coming artists.
VOD Publishing - An online, and print publication. A catalog of Noise/Industrial music and record pricing guide.

Discography

References

German record labels
Cassette culture 1970s–1990s